Elite 1 may refer to:

Elite 1 (rugby league), the top level rugby league competition in France
Elite One, the top division of association football in Cameroon

See also
Elite (video game)
Elite (disambiguation)